Propterus is an extinct genus of prehistoric ray-finned fish of the Solnhofen Plattenkalk.

See also

 Prehistoric fish
 List of prehistoric bony fish

References

Prehistoric ray-finned fish genera
Macrosemiiformes
Solnhofen fauna